The 2002–03 Chicago Blackhawks season was the Chicago Blackhawks' 77th season of operation. Finishing ninth in the Western Conference, they failed to qualify for the playoffs.

Offseason
Forward Alexei Zhamnov was named captain, following the departure of Tony Amonte.

Regular season
January 8, 2003: Chicago Blackhawks goaltender Michael Leighton gained a shutout in his NHL debut in a 0-0 tie versus the Phoenix Coyotes. Coyotes goaltender Zac Bierk earned his first career shutout, although it was not his NHL debut. It was the first time that two goalies in the same game both earned their first career shutouts.

Final standings

Schedule and results

|- align="center" bgcolor="#FFBBBB"
|1||L||October 10, 2002||1–2 || align="left"| @ Columbus Blue Jackets (2002–03) ||0–1–0–0 || 
|- align="center" bgcolor="#CCFFCC" 
|2||W||October 13, 2002||3–0 || align="left"|  Buffalo Sabres (2002–03) ||1–1–0–0 || 
|- align="center" bgcolor="#CCFFCC" 
|3||W||October 17, 2002||4–1 || align="left"|  Florida Panthers (2002–03) ||2–1–0–0 || 
|- align="center" bgcolor="#FFBBBB"
|4||L||October 19, 2002||2–5 || align="left"|  Calgary Flames (2002–03) ||2–2–0–0 || 
|- align="center" bgcolor="#FFBBBB"
|5||L||October 24, 2002||2–3 || align="left"|  Minnesota Wild (2002–03) ||2–3–0–0 || 
|- align="center" 
|6||T||October 26, 2002||3–3 OT|| align="left"| @ Carolina Hurricanes (2002–03) ||2–3–1–0 || 
|- align="center" bgcolor="#CCFFCC" 
|7||W||October 27, 2002||3–2 || align="left"|  San Jose Sharks (2002–03) ||3–3–1–0 || 
|- align="center" bgcolor="#CCFFCC" 
|8||W||October 29, 2002||3–2 || align="left"|  Columbus Blue Jackets (2002–03) ||4–3–1–0 || 
|- align="center" bgcolor="#CCFFCC" 
|9||W||October 31, 2002||2–1 OT|| align="left"|  Los Angeles Kings (2002–03) ||5–3–1–0 || 
|-

|- align="center" bgcolor="#FFBBBB"
|10||L||November 2, 2002||1–5 || align="left"| @ New Jersey Devils (2002–03) ||5–4–1–0 || 
|- align="center" bgcolor="#FFBBBB"
|11||L||November 3, 2002||1–4 || align="left"|  Edmonton Oilers (2002–03) ||5–5–1–0 || 
|- align="center" bgcolor="#CCFFCC" 
|12||W||November 5, 2002||2–0 || align="left"| @ Detroit Red Wings (2002–03) ||6–5–1–0 || 
|- align="center" bgcolor="#CCFFCC" 
|13||W||November 7, 2002||5–0 || align="left"|  Atlanta Thrashers (2002–03) ||7–5–1–0 || 
|- align="center" bgcolor="#CCFFCC" 
|14||W||November 9, 2002||3–2 OT|| align="left"| @ Tampa Bay Lightning (2002–03) ||8–5–1–0 || 
|- align="center" 
|15||T||November 11, 2002||2–2 OT|| align="left"| @ Florida Panthers (2002–03) ||8–5–2–0 || 
|- align="center" 
|16||T||November 15, 2002||2–2 OT|| align="left"|  Washington Capitals (2002–03) ||8–5–3–0 || 
|- align="center" bgcolor="#CCFFCC" 
|17||W||November 17, 2002||4–2 || align="left"|  Nashville Predators (2002–03) ||9–5–3–0 || 
|- align="center" bgcolor="#FFBBBB"
|18||L||November 19, 2002||1–3 || align="left"| @ Edmonton Oilers (2002–03) ||9–6–3–0 || 
|- align="center" bgcolor="#FFBBBB"
|19||L||November 20, 2002||3–5 || align="left"| @ Vancouver Canucks (2002–03) ||9–7–3–0 || 
|- align="center" bgcolor="#FFBBBB"
|20||L||November 23, 2002||1–3 || align="left"| @ Calgary Flames (2002–03) ||9–8–3–0 || 
|- align="center" bgcolor="#FFBBBB"
|21||L||November 25, 2002||0–1 || align="left"| @ Colorado Avalanche (2002–03) ||9–9–3–0 || 
|- align="center" bgcolor="#CCFFCC" 
|22||W||November 28, 2002||4–2 || align="left"| @ Phoenix Coyotes (2002–03) ||10–9–3–0 || 
|- align="center" bgcolor="#FFBBBB"
|23||L||November 30, 2002||1–4 || align="left"| @ Los Angeles Kings (2002–03) ||10–10–3–0 || 
|-

|- align="center" bgcolor="#FFBBBB"
|24||L||December 1, 2002||2–3 || align="left"| @ Mighty Ducks of Anaheim (2002–03) ||10–11–3–0 || 
|- align="center" bgcolor="#CCFFCC" 
|25||W||December 4, 2002||1–0 || align="left"|  Ottawa Senators (2002–03) ||11–11–3–0 || 
|- align="center" bgcolor="#FFBBBB"
|26||L||December 6, 2002||3–4 || align="left"|  Mighty Ducks of Anaheim (2002–03) ||11–12–3–0 || 
|- align="center" bgcolor="#CCFFCC" 
|27||W||December 8, 2002||3–1 || align="left"|  Tampa Bay Lightning (2002–03) ||12–12–3–0 || 
|- align="center" bgcolor="#CCFFCC" 
|28||W||December 10, 2002||3–2 || align="left"| @ New York Islanders (2002–03) ||13–12–3–0 || 
|- align="center" bgcolor="#CCFFCC" 
|29||W||December 11, 2002||4–3 || align="left"| @ New York Rangers (2002–03) ||14–12–3–0 || 
|- align="center" 
|30||T||December 13, 2002||1–1 OT|| align="left"| @ Buffalo Sabres (2002–03) ||14–12–4–0 || 
|- align="center" bgcolor="#FFBBBB"
|31||L||December 15, 2002||0–5 || align="left"|  Dallas Stars (2002–03) ||14–13–4–0 || 
|- align="center" bgcolor="#CCFFCC" 
|32||W||December 17, 2002||3–2 || align="left"|  Vancouver Canucks (2002–03) ||15–13–4–0 || 
|- align="center" bgcolor="#CCFFCC" 
|33||W||December 20, 2002||3–1 || align="left"|  Columbus Blue Jackets (2002–03) ||16–13–4–0 || 
|- align="center" bgcolor="#CCFFCC" 
|34||W||December 22, 2002||3–1 || align="left"|  Los Angeles Kings (2002–03) ||17–13–4–0 || 
|- align="center" 
|35||T||December 26, 2002||2–2 OT|| align="left"|  Minnesota Wild (2002–03) ||17–13–5–0 || 
|- align="center" 
|36||T||December 28, 2002||3–3 OT|| align="left"| @ San Jose Sharks (2002–03) ||17–13–6–0 || 
|- align="center" bgcolor="#CCFFCC" 
|37||W||December 30, 2002||2–0 || align="left"| @ Los Angeles Kings (2002–03) ||18–13–6–0 || 
|-

|- align="center" bgcolor="#CCFFCC" 
|38||W||January 2, 2003||4–1 || align="left"| @ St. Louis Blues (2002–03) ||19–13–6–0 || 
|- align="center" 
|39||T||January 4, 2003||3–3 OT|| align="left"| @ Nashville Predators (2002–03) ||19–13–7–0 || 
|- align="center" bgcolor="#FF6F6F"
|40||OTL||January 5, 2003||3–4 OT|| align="left"|  Detroit Red Wings (2002–03) ||19–13–7–1 || 
|- align="center" 
|41||T||January 8, 2003||0–0 OT|| align="left"|  Phoenix Coyotes (2002–03) ||19–13–8–1 || 
|- align="center" bgcolor="#FF6F6F"
|42||OTL||January 9, 2003||3–4 OT|| align="left"| @ Dallas Stars (2002–03) ||19–13–8–2 || 
|- align="center" bgcolor="#CCFFCC" 
|43||W||January 12, 2003||2–0 || align="left"|  Nashville Predators (2002–03) ||20–13–8–2 || 
|- align="center" bgcolor="#FF6F6F"
|44||OTL||January 13, 2003||4–5 OT|| align="left"| @ Detroit Red Wings (2002–03) ||20–13–8–3 || 
|- align="center" bgcolor="#CCFFCC" 
|45||W||January 15, 2003||4–1 || align="left"|  Detroit Red Wings (2002–03) ||21–13–8–3 || 
|- align="center" bgcolor="#FFBBBB"
|46||L||January 17, 2003||2–4 || align="left"|  Vancouver Canucks (2002–03) ||21–14–8–3 || 
|- align="center" bgcolor="#FFBBBB"
|47||L||January 18, 2003||2–4 || align="left"| @ St. Louis Blues (2002–03) ||21–15–8–3 || 
|- align="center" bgcolor="#FFBBBB"
|48||L||January 20, 2003||1–5 || align="left"| @ Columbus Blue Jackets (2002–03) ||21–16–8–3 || 
|- align="center" 
|49||T||January 23, 2003||3–3 OT|| align="left"|  St. Louis Blues (2002–03) ||21–16–9–3 || 
|- align="center" bgcolor="#FFBBBB"
|50||L||January 25, 2003||3–5 || align="left"| @ Pittsburgh Penguins (2002–03) ||21–17–9–3 || 
|- align="center" bgcolor="#FFBBBB"
|51||L||January 26, 2003||3–4 || align="left"| @ Montreal Canadiens (2002–03) ||21–18–9–3 || 
|- align="center" bgcolor="#CCFFCC" 
|52||W||January 30, 2003||3–1 || align="left"| @ Boston Bruins (2002–03) ||22–18–9–3 || 
|-

|- align="center" bgcolor="#FFBBBB"
|53||L||February 5, 2003||1–2 || align="left"| @ Minnesota Wild (2002–03) ||22–19–9–3 || 
|- align="center" 
|54||T||February 6, 2003||2–2 OT|| align="left"| @ Calgary Flames (2002–03) ||22–19–10–3 || 
|- align="center" bgcolor="#CCFFCC" 
|55||W||February 8, 2003||3–0 || align="left"| @ Edmonton Oilers (2002–03) ||23–19–10–3 || 
|- align="center" bgcolor="#FFBBBB"
|56||L||February 10, 2003||1–2 || align="left"| @ Vancouver Canucks (2002–03) ||23–20–10–3 || 
|- align="center" bgcolor="#FFBBBB"
|57||L||February 12, 2003||1–3 || align="left"|  Toronto Maple Leafs (2002–03) ||23–21–10–3 || 
|- align="center" bgcolor="#FFBBBB"
|58||L||February 14, 2003||2–4 || align="left"|  San Jose Sharks (2002–03) ||23–22–10–3 || 
|- align="center" bgcolor="#CCFFCC" 
|59||W||February 15, 2003||7–1 || align="left"| @ Columbus Blue Jackets (2002–03) ||24–22–10–3 || 
|- align="center" bgcolor="#FFBBBB"
|60||L||February 17, 2003||4–5 || align="left"|  Colorado Avalanche (2002–03) ||24–23–10–3 || 
|- align="center" bgcolor="#FFBBBB"
|61||L||February 20, 2003||1–2 || align="left"|  Phoenix Coyotes (2002–03) ||24–24–10–3 || 
|- align="center" bgcolor="#FFBBBB"
|62||L||February 23, 2003||0–3 || align="left"|  Dallas Stars (2002–03) ||24–25–10–3 || 
|- align="center" bgcolor="#FFBBBB"
|63||L||February 25, 2003||0–2 || align="left"|  Philadelphia Flyers (2002–03) ||24–26–10–3 || 
|- align="center" bgcolor="#FFBBBB"
|64||L||February 27, 2003||2–5 || align="left"| @ Philadelphia Flyers (2002–03) ||24–27–10–3 || 
|-

|- align="center" bgcolor="#FF6F6F"
|65||OTL||March 1, 2003||4–5 OT|| align="left"| @ Nashville Predators (2002–03) ||24–27–10–4 || 
|- align="center" bgcolor="#FF6F6F"
|66||OTL||March 2, 2003||2–3 OT|| align="left"|  Colorado Avalanche (2002–03) ||24–27–10–5 || 
|- align="center" bgcolor="#FFBBBB"
|67||L||March 5, 2003||4–7 || align="left"| @ Dallas Stars (2002–03) ||24–28–10–5 || 
|- align="center" bgcolor="#FFBBBB"
|68||L||March 7, 2003||0–2 || align="left"|  Calgary Flames (2002–03) ||24–29–10–5 || 
|- align="center" bgcolor="#CCFFCC" 
|69||W||March 9, 2003||8–5 || align="left"|  Boston Bruins (2002–03) ||25–29–10–5 || 
|- align="center" bgcolor="#FFBBBB"
|70||L||March 12, 2003||2–5 || align="left"| @ Mighty Ducks of Anaheim (2002–03) ||25–30–10–5 || 
|- align="center" bgcolor="#CCFFCC" 
|71||W||March 14, 2003||4–0 || align="left"| @ Phoenix Coyotes (2002–03) ||26–30–10–5 || 
|- align="center" bgcolor="#CCFFCC" 
|72||W||March 17, 2003||3–2 OT|| align="left"| @ San Jose Sharks (2002–03) ||27–30–10–5 || 
|- align="center" bgcolor="#FFBBBB"
|73||L||March 19, 2003||3–4 || align="left"|  Mighty Ducks of Anaheim (2002–03) ||27–31–10–5 || 
|- align="center" bgcolor="#FFBBBB"
|74||L||March 22, 2003||1–8 || align="left"| @ Colorado Avalanche (2002–03) ||27–32–10–5 || 
|- align="center" 
|75||T||March 23, 2003||1–1 OT|| align="left"|  Pittsburgh Penguins (2002–03) ||27–32–11–5 || 
|- align="center" bgcolor="#FFBBBB"
|76||L||March 25, 2003||2–9 || align="left"|  New York Islanders (2002–03) ||27–33–11–5 || 
|- align="center" bgcolor="#CCFFCC" 
|77||W||March 27, 2003||4–1 || align="left"|  Nashville Predators (2002–03) ||28–33–11–5 || 
|- align="center" bgcolor="#FF6F6F"
|78||OTL||March 28, 2003||3–4 OT|| align="left"| @ Minnesota Wild (2002–03) ||28–33–11–6 || 
|- align="center" 
|79||T||March 30, 2003||4–4 OT|| align="left"|  Edmonton Oilers (2002–03) ||28–33–12–6 || 
|-

|- align="center" bgcolor="#CCFFCC" 
|80||W||April 3, 2003||6–4 || align="left"| @ St. Louis Blues (2002–03) ||29–33–12–6 || 
|- align="center" 
|81||T||April 4, 2003||2–2 OT|| align="left"|  St. Louis Blues (2002–03) ||29–33–13–6 || 
|- align="center" bgcolor="#CCFFCC" 
|82||W||April 6, 2003||4–3 OT|| align="left"|  Detroit Red Wings (2002–03) ||30–33–13–6 || 
|-

|-
| Legend:

Player statistics

Scoring
 Position abbreviations: C = Center; D = Defense; G = Goaltender; LW = Left Wing; RW = Right Wing
  = Joined team via a transaction (e.g., trade, waivers, signing) during the season. Stats reflect time with the Blackhawks only.
  = Left team via a transaction (e.g., trade, waivers, release) during the season. Stats reflect time with the Blackhawks only.

Goaltending

Awards and records

Awards

Milestones

Transactions
The Blackhawks were involved in the following transactions from June 14, 2002, the day after the deciding game of the 2002 Stanley Cup Finals, through June 9, 2003, the day of the deciding game of the 2003 Stanley Cup Finals.

Trades

Players acquired

Players lost

Signings

Draft picks
Chicago's draft picks at the 2002 NHL Entry Draft held at the Air Canada Centre in Toronto, Ontario.

See also
2002–03 NHL season

Notes

References

Chic
Chic
Chicago Blackhawks seasons
Chic
Chic